The Magistrates' Courts Act 1980 (c. 43) is an Act of the Parliament of the United Kingdom. It is a consolidation Act. It codifies the procedures applicable in the magistrates' courts of England and Wales and largely replaces the Magistrates' Courts Act 1952. Part I of the Act sets out provisions in relation to the courts' criminal jurisdiction, and Part II in relation to civil proceedings.

Section 1 of the Act empowers a justice of the peace to issue a summons or arrest warrant alleging the commission of a crime against an identifiable person.  Section 127 of the Act establishes a six-month limitation period for summary (but not indictable) offences.

See also
Magistrates' Courts Act

References

External links
Magistrates' Courts Act 1980, as amended from the National Archives.
Magistrates' Courts Act 1980, as originally enacted from the National Archives.

Acts of the Parliament of the United Kingdom concerning England and Wales
English criminal law
United Kingdom Acts of Parliament 1980
Magistrates' courts in England and Wales
1980 in England
1980 in Wales